The Great Abdication could refer to:

 The 1936 abdication of Edward VIII of the United Kingdom, where he ultimately relinquished the throne to wed American divorcée, Wallis Simpson.
 According to the eschatology of some branches of Christianity, it is the event where Jesus will relinquish his rule to God the Father.